Stroker Ace is a 1983 American action comedy sport film directed by Hal Needham and starring Burt Reynolds as the eponymous Stroker Ace, a NASCAR driver.

Burt Reynolds turned down the role of astronaut Garrett Breedlove in Terms of Endearment to do this film. The role went to Jack Nicholson, who went on to win an Oscar. Reynolds said he made this decision because "I felt I owed Hal more than I owed Jim" but that it was a turning point in his career from which he never recovered. Although car-themed films starring Reynolds had all previously been successes – including four made with Needham – Stroker Ace flopped. "That's where I lost them," he later said of his fans.

Plot 
Stroker Ace is a popular race car driver from Waycross, Georgia, and a three-time champion in the NASCAR Winston Cup Series driving a #7 Ford Thunderbird. An all-or-nothing man, he wins if he does not crash. He is arrogant and pompous, with no regard for the business side of his racing team. He also has an on-track, season-long rivalry with ambitious young driver Aubrey James, who drives the #10 Four-Star Whiskey Buick Regal.

When Stroker runs afoul of his current sponsor, Jim Catty of Zenon Oil, by dumping a load of wet concrete on him, he has to find a new one. Fried-chicken mogul Clyde Torkle, along with his chauffeur, Arnold, and newly appointed director of marketing and public relations, Pembrook Feeny, convince Stroker and his chief mechanic, Lugs Harvey, to sign up with him.

Overlooking his contract by not reading its specifics, Stroker begins a new life as the commercial face for the Chicken Pit fast-food restaurants. (The slogan on Stroker's car reads: "The Fastest Chicken in the South.") His contract proves to stipulate that he must do personal appearances, which include dressing up in a chicken suit—feet included.

Realizing that he is locked into a bad deal, Stroker devises a plan with Lugs to get out of it. Torkle is on to Stroker, though, and allows his antics because he sees the racer as his big ticket to regional fame by promoting the Chicken Pit franchise.

A ladies' man, Stroker tries to seduce the beautiful Pembrook, who is a Sunday School teacher, does not drink, and is a virgin. She spurns all of his advances until he learns to respect her views. One night, after getting her drunk on champagne, he removes her clothing and has a chance to take advantage of her, but decides against it.

Stroker is winning races under the Chicken Pit sponsorship and is in the running for the season-ending championship. At the beginning of the final race, Torkle is offered a deal to sell his franchise for a huge profit. The catch is that if he wins the championship Stroker has to sell chicken for the next two years; if he loses is he out of the contract.

During the race Stroker is at odds with himself. He drops back in the race in an effort to lose, but his ego won't let him so he quickly begins moving back through the pack. Torkle, realizing that Stroker would rather lose than be bound by the contract, makes a public announcement that he is releasing Stroker immediately. He is unaware that Stroker is moving up through the field in an effort to win.

With the news that he is free from the contract, Stroker wins the championship in spectacular fashion by flipping his car over as he crosses the finish line. Torkle then finds that the lucrative offer for his chicken franchise is a fake, cooked up by Stroker and his friends.

Cast
 Burt Reynolds as Stroker Ace
 Ned Beatty as Clyde Torkle
 Jim Nabors as "Lugs" Harvey
 Parker Stevenson as Aubrey James
 Loni Anderson as Pembrook Feeny
 John Byner as "Doc" Seegle
 Frank O. Hill as "Dad" Seegle
 Cassandra Peterson as Elvira
 Bubba Smith as Arnold
 Warren Stevens as Jim Catty
 Alfie Wise as Charlie
 Cary Guffey as "Little Doc"
 Neil Bonnett as himself 
 Dale Earnhardt as himself
 Harry Gant as himself 
 David Hobbs as himself 
 Terry Labonte as himself 
 Benny Parsons as himself 
 Kyle Petty as himself 
 Richard Petty as himself 
 Jerry Reed as himself 
 Tim Richmond as himself
 Ricky Rudd as himself 
 Linda Vaughn as herself 
 Cale Yarborough as himself
 Ken Squier as himself
 Chris Economaki as himself

Development

Novel 
The film was adapted from the 1973 novel Stand on It, an autobiography of fictional driver "Stroker Ace." The novel's joint authors, William Neely and Robert K. Ottum, based the book on actual events from the racing world but with their protagonist as the subject.

The critic from the Chicago Tribune thought it "would do for stock car racing what... Semi-Tough did for football." "How this one found its way between hard covers is a mystery," wrote The New York Times.

Development 
In 1977, Philip Feldman of First Artists Productions announced the company had bought the film rights to the novel to make a vehicle for Paul Newman. The following year Mort Sahl was reportedly writing a script.

Producer Walter Wood read the novel in 1978 and decided it would make a film. "I see it as an innocent, unpretentious comedy," said Wood. "I just wanted it to be a slice of fun."

"It was never my intention to make a 'racing film'," he added. "I wanted a light comedy and that's what I got. I also wanted Hal Needham to direct and Burt Reynolds to star and that's who I got. I knew that they'd know about the milieu and that they'd teach me. Those guys know the film's characters. Stroker is a composite."

He got Hal Needham, who owned a NASCAR racing team with Reynolds, to direct. Needham got Burt Reynolds to star. "I didn't actually ask Burt if he'd like to do it," said Needham, "but when I was in New York I looked him up and told him how funny the script was. Two days later he called and said 'Needham, I want to do that film'. I hadn't been laying a trap for him. With his other commitments I just didn't see how he could do it but he pushed everything back to fit this one in."

The actor's fee was reportedly $5 million. Finance came from Warners and Universal, which both owed Reynolds a film – Universal got domestic theatrical, Warners other domestic and foreign.

The co-stars were Jim Nabors, Loni Anderson, Ned Beatty, Parker Stevenson, and Bubba Smith, with appearances by many NASCAR drivers, such as: Dale Earnhardt, Richard Petty, Neil Bonnett, Harry Gant, Terry Labonte, Kyle Petty, Benny Parsons, Tim Richmond, Ricky Rudd, Cale Yarborough, and announcers Ken Squier, David Hobbs, and Chris Economaki.

The film was Anderson's feature debut, although she was already well known through her appearances in WKRP in Cincinnati and in TV movies.

Filming 
Stroker Ace was filmed in North Carolina Georgia, and Alabama at Charlotte Motor Speedway, Talladega Superspeedway and the Atlanta Motor Speedway in Hampton, Georgia.

"We wanted to make a very broad comedy and I was worried that the drivers might resent it when they saw it," Wood said. "But they loved the simplicity of it, so I'm off the hook as far as the racing is concerned."

"If you like Burt Reynolds, you'll like this movie," the producer added. "It was made for his fans which, for a producer, is not a bad reason to make a movie. I've never been involved in so commercial a movie. I'm not really that financially-oriented. I always go for the subject. I've lost a couple of fortunes doing that. Making Stroker Ace was like being a kid and running away with the circus. But that's not my lifestyle."

Music
The music score was originally written by Ry Cooder who said the film "when you’re scoring a film about race cars, you’re either playing Deep South funk or rockabilly" and that the movie "had enough racing action to make the rockabilly tempo work. I got this incredible rockabilly ensemble together, and the director just hated our music! He fired all of us right after 
he heard the tape." However Cooder says he later used the music in his score for Streets of Fire.

The theme song was performed by Charlie Daniels.

Reception 
The film was a critical failure. It received five Golden Raspberry Award nominations including Worst Picture, Worst Director, Worst Actress (Anderson) and Worst New Star (also for Anderson), winning one for Jim Nabors as Worst Supporting Actor.

Vincent Canby of The New York Times called it "the must-miss movie of the summer. It's a witless retread of the earlier, far funnier road-movie collaborations of Mr. Needham and Mr. Reynolds, especially of their two 'Smokey and the Bandit' movies." Roger Ebert gave the film 1.5 stars out of four and wrote "To call the movie a lightweight, bubble-headed summer entertainment is not criticism but simply description." Gene Siskel gave the film zero stars out of four, writing "Reynolds' reputation as a serious actor is virtually destroyed with this miserable picture. He's sending only one message here: Fans, I'm in it for the money. What other explanation is possible?" Variety wrote that the Reynolds-Needham team were "just coasting in circles, trying to pick up whatever prize money might be attracted by their track record." Sheila Benson of the Los Angeles Times described Reynolds as "ambling through the movie as though it were a colossal in-joke, which, of course, it must be, since it isn't perceptibly funny to anyone outside Reynolds and Needham's immediate circle." Gary Arnold was somewhat more positive, calling it "a knuckleheaded but amiable summer trifle."

Wood said "For the past five years, Burt has been No. 1 at the box office, and during that period, there has seldom been a good review of anything he's done." However the film was a major commercial disappointment.

On Rotten Tomatoes, the film has a 19% approval rating based on 16 reviews, with an average rating of 3.5/10. On Metacritic the film has a score of 30% based on reviews from 5 critics, indicating "generally unfavorable reviews".

Legacy 
For the 2019 Bojangles' Southern 500, Rick Ware Racing used Stroker Ace's No. 7 car as the basis for their No. 51 car's throwback paint scheme for driver BJ McLeod.

Spire Motorsports used a Stroker Ace scheme for their No. 7 car driven by Corey LaJoie for the 2021 Hollywood Casino 400 as well as Justin Haley (racing driver) driving a replica throwback scheme honoring Aubrey James paint scheme.

References

External links
 
 
 
 
 

1983 films
1983 romantic comedy films
1980s sports comedy films
American action comedy films
American auto racing films
American romantic comedy films
American screwball comedy films
American sports comedy films
Ace, Stroker
Ace, Stroker
Ace, Stroker
Ace, Stroker
Ace, Stroker
Films based on American novels
Films directed by Hal Needham
Films shot in North Carolina
Films with screenplays by Hugh Wilson
Golden Raspberry Award winning films
Ace, Stroker
NASCAR mass media
Universal Pictures films
Warner Bros. films
1980s English-language films
1980s American films